is a Japanese voice actor. He is married to Minami Hokuto, better known by her stage name Hitomi. He also provided the voice of adult video games.

Notable voice roles

Anime 
1994
 Nintama Rantarō (Terai-Mawa, Hachimijiogan, Takuro Seppa)
1995
 Zenki (Inugamiro)
 Juu Senshi Gulkeeva (Greyfus)
1996
 B'tX (Fou Raffine)
1997
 Hikarian - Great Railroad Protector (Seven)
 Kindaichi Shounen no Jikenbo (Takashi Inukai)
 Chō Mashin Eiyūden Wataru (Dream)
1998
 Sexy Commando Gaiden: Sugoi yo!! Masaru-san (Machahiko Kondo)
 Ojarumaru (Aobee, Makoto Tamura, Icchoku Honda, Sam, Cow)
 If I See You in My Dreams (Youhei Kaizuka)
1999
 Crest of the Stars (Kahyul)
 Iketeru Futari (Chief Kuroki)
 To Heart (Hiroyuki Fujita)
 Jubei-Chan The Ninja Girl - Secret of the Lovely Eyepatch (Tenryō Tsumura, Makojiro Hattori)
 Puppet Master Sakon (Tsutomu Saeki)
 Di Gi Charat (Mister Manager)
2000
 Mushrambo (Gitai)
 Brigadoon (Saiban-chou)
 Gear Fighter Dendoh (Gurumet, Keisuke Kusanagi, Meteor)
2001
 Gekito! Crush Gear Turbo (Godboy)
 Banner of the Stars II (Kahyul)
2002
 Digimon Frontier (Baromon)
 Witch Hunter Robin (Kazuya Misawa)
 Ghost in the Shell: Stand Alone Complex (Guru Guru)
2003
 Ashita no Nadja (Dancho)
 Di Gi Charat Nyo! (Michel Usada)
2004
 Yugo the Negotiator (Shekin)
 Burst Angel (Jei)
 Beet the Vandel Buster (Bruzamu)
 Kakyuusei 2 (Sukekiyo Kôdaiji)
 Magical Girl Lyrical Nanoha (Shiro Takamachi)
 ToHeart - Remember my memories (Hiroyuki Fujita)
 Mobile Suit Gundam SEED Destiny (Captain Todaka)
2005
 Magical Girl Lyrical Nanoha A's (Zafira)
 Hell Girl (Koichiro Kisaragi)
 Beet the Vandel Buster Excellion (Hangu)
2006
 Going Wild (Mondo)
 Yamato Nadeshiko Shichi Henge <3 (Captain Wing)
 Kenichi: The Mightiest Disciple (Daimonji, Shinnosuke Tsuji)
2007
 Demashitaa! Powerpuff Girls Z (Aji Monster)
 GeGeGe no Kitarō (Hiruda)
 My Bride Is a Mermaid (Sword Master)
 Magical Girl Lyrical Nanoha StrikerS (Zafira)
 Lovely Complex (Principal)
 Suteki Tantei Labyrinth (Echigo)
2008
 Kimi ga Aruji de Shitsuji ga Ore de (Assassin)
 Bus Gamer (Maezono)
 S.A (President)
 Chaos;Head (Yasuji Ban)
2009
 Fairy Tail (Hot Eye, Wally, Wonderful Gotch)
2010
 Dance in the Vampire Bund (Takashi Saijo)
 The Legend of the Legendary Heroes (Count Klasbel)
 And Yet the Town Moves (Usher)
 Togainu no Chi (Motomi)
 Fortune Arterial: Akai Yakusoku (Masanori Aoto)
2011
 Denpa Onna to Seishun Otoko (Maekawa's father)
 Nura: Rise of the Yokai Clan: Demon Capital (Kyōkotsu)
2012
 Natsume's Book of Friends (Rokka)
2013
 Bakumatsu Gijinden Roman (Oya, Nagai, Kuroda Kanbee)
 DD Hokuto no Ken (Raoh)
 Gifū Dōdō!! Kanetsugu to Keiji (Fake Keiji)
 Outbreak Company (Prime Minister Zahaa)
 One Piece (Breed)
 Re:_Hamatora (Natsukawa)
2015
 Magical Girl Lyrical Nanoha ViVid (Zafira)
2017
 One Piece (Charlotte Moscato)
 Magical Girl Ore (Kokoro-chan)

OVA and Movies 

1997
 Jungle Emperor Leo (Alan)
2002
 Animation Runner Kuromi (Go, Nonki Hayama, Seiichiro Haryu)
2003
 Triangle Heart: Sweet Songs Forever (Shirō Takamachi)
2004
 Animation Runner Kuromi 2 (Seiichiro Haryu)
2012
 Magical Girl Lyrical Nanoha the Movie 2nd A's (Zafira)
2017
 Magical Girl Lyrical Nanoha Reflection (Zafira)
2018
 Servamp -Alice in the Garden- (Mikado Alicein)

Drama CD
 Amai Tsumi no Kajitsu (Kazuomi Toudou)
 GENE Tenshi wa Sakareru (Baruto)
 Gouka Kyakusen de Koi wa Hajimaru series 4, 5, 7, 8 (Rin)
 Kizu (Yuusuke Ariga)
 News Center no Koibito (Masahiko Sashou)
 Pearl series 2: Yokubari na Pearl (Reiji)
 Pearl series 3: Wagamama na Pearl (Reiji)
 Pearl series 4: Kimagure na Pearl (Reiji)
 Trinity Blood (Abel Nightlord, Cain Knightlord)
 Ze (Waki Yoshiwara)
 Romeo (Diager)

Video Games 
1999
 The King of Fighters '99 (Jhun Hoon)
2000
 The King of Fighters 2000 (Jhun Hoon)
2003
 The King of Fighters 2003 (Jhun Hoon)
2009
 The King of Fighters 2002: Unlimited Match (Jhun Hoon)
2020
 The King of Fighters All Star (Jhun Hoon)

Eroge 
2002
 Floralia (Shigeru Sawatari, Koichi Tamura)
 Enzai (Evan)
2003
 Sore ga Bokura no Renai Seikatsu (Toshihiro Hakushou)
 Take Off! (Shiro Sagami)
 Clover Heart's (Saionji-sensei)
2004
 Yin-Yang! X-Change Alternative (Renji Saotome)
 Fanatica (Curtis Lindstrom, Bertrand)
2005
 Togainu no Chi (Motomi)
 Zettai Fukujuu Meirei (Lawless Streich)
2007
 Gekkou no Carnevale (Guglielmo)
 Touka Gettan (Hiroto Kaga)
2008
 Fortune Arterial (Masanori Aoto)
2010
 Axanael (Jaburu)
2011
 Aiyoku no Eustia (Varrius Meisner)

General 
1995
 3x3 Eyes: Kyuusei Koushu (Varanasi)
2002
 Natsuiro no Sunadokei (Gahaku Saeki)
 Groove Adventure Rave: Mikan no Hiseki (Lance, Aniki)
 Unlimited Saga (Bel Bend, Clyde)
2005
 Angel's Feather (Shingo Souma)
2008
 Chaos;Head (Yasuji Ban)
2009
 Chaos;Head Noah (Yasuji Ban)
 Touka Gettan: Tsuki no Nai Kao II (Hiroto Kaga)
2010
 Mahou Shoujo Lyrical Nanoha A's Portable: The Battle of Aces (Zafira)

Tokusatsu
2014
 Ressha Sentai ToQger (Soap Shadow (ep. 21))
2015
 Kamen Rider Drive (Gamma Assault (ep. 48))
 Kamen Rider Ghost (Narration)
2019
 Kishiryu Sentai Ryusoulger (Narration)

References

External links
Kazuya Ichijō at the Seiyuu database
Ken Production

1966 births
Living people
Male voice actors from Kobe
Japanese male video game actors
Japanese male voice actors
20th-century Japanese male actors
21st-century Japanese male actors